Lorenzo Serra Ferrer (born 5 March 1953) is a Spanish football manager. 

His career was mainly associated with Mallorca and Betis, and he also served the former in various other capacities.

Playing career
Born in Sa Pobla, Mallorca, Balearic Islands, Serra Ferrer played three years with local amateurs UD Poblense in the Tercera División, retiring from football at only 23.

Coaching career

Early years
After coaching youth team La Salle, Serra Ferrer joined his only club as a player in 1980. After two national championships, he led them to a first-ever promotion to the Segunda División B in his second season.

Mallorca
In 1983, Serra Ferrer signed for another side in the region, RCD Mallorca, spending two years with the B team. In the 1983–84 season, he also coached the main squad in one game as an interim manager.

With Mallorca, Serra Ferrer promoted twice to La Liga, in 1986 and 1989, also reaching the Copa del Rey final in 1991, losing 1–0 to Atlético Madrid.

Betis
After eight full seasons with Mallorca, Serra Ferrer joined Real Betis of Segunda División, immediately earning promotion and subsequently achieving a third place the following campaign, only trailing champions Real Madrid and Deportivo de La Coruña whilst posting the best defensive record in the league (25 goals in 38 matches) and qualifying for the UEFA Cup.

In 1997, Serra Ferrer led Betis to the domestic cup final (a 3–2 overtime loss against FC Barcelona), after once again qualifying the Andalusians for European competitions with a fourth-place finish in the league.

Barcelona, Betis return
Serra Ferrer moved to Barcelona after the Spanish Cup final, but spent three years working in directorial capacities. In 2000–01, after being named Louis van Gaal's successor following the latter's dismissal, he coached the team until the 31st matchday, being fired after a 3–1 defeat at CA Osasuna with the Catalans in the fifth position, trailing leaders Real Madrid by 17 points; he was replaced by former club legend Carles Rexach.

In 2004, Serra Ferrer returned to Betis, leading it to another top-four league finish – with the subsequent qualification to the UEFA Champions League, a first-ever – as well as winning that season's Spanish Cup. The following campaign the team only managed to rank 14th in the league, also being ousted in the Champions League group stage in spite of a 1–0 home win against Chelsea.

AEK Athens
Serra Ferrer joined AEK Athens F.C. from Greece in the summer of 2006. In his first season he led the capital club to the second place in the domestic league, as the team also achieved their first Champions League wins against Lille OSC and A.C. Milan, being eventually ousted in the group phase.

In late May 2007, Serra Ferrer signed a four-year extension to his contract, which was to expire at the end of 2007–08. On 13 August, as AEK was drawn against Sevilla FC in the Champions League third qualifying round, he stated: "The tie (vs Sevilla) will be intensely emotional for me", adding "I will return to a city I love very dearly." The Spaniards eventually won 6–1 on aggregate.

On 12 February 2008, Serra Ferrer was fired by AEK after an early exit in the Greek Cup, and a poor league run that saw the side drop from first to third in the space of a week.

Mallorca return
On 29 June 2010, a group headed by Serra Ferrer became the new owner of Mallorca, taking over from main shareholder Mateu Alemany for a fee believed to be around €2 million. On 9 July he was named the club's vice president and director of football, as it was in the process of going into voluntary administration, trying to sort out debts of up to €85 million.

Honours
Poblense
Tercera División: 1980–81, 1981–82

Mallorca
Copa del Rey runner-up: 1990–91

Betis
Copa del Rey: 2004–05; runner-up: 1996–97

References

External links

1953 births
Living people
People from Sa Pobla
Spanish footballers
Footballers from Mallorca
Spanish football managers
La Liga managers
Segunda División managers
Segunda División B managers
Tercera División managers
RCD Mallorca B managers
RCD Mallorca managers
Real Betis managers
FC Barcelona managers
Super League Greece managers
AEK Athens F.C. managers
Spanish expatriate football managers
Expatriate football managers in Greece
Spanish expatriate sportspeople in Greece
Spanish football chairmen and investors
Association footballers not categorized by position